Chicoreus damicornis, common name the long-horned murex, is a species of sea snail, a marine gastropod mollusk in the family Muricidae, the murex snails or rock snails.

Description
The size of an adult shell varies between 25 mm and 80 mm.

Distribution
This subtidal marine species is found along Southeast Australia.

References

 GE Radwin, A D'Attilio, Murex shells of the world: an illustrated guide to the Muricidae; Stanford Univ Press, 1976

External links
 Sea shells of New South Wales: Chicoreus damicornis ; accessed: 25 June 2011

Gastropods described in 1903
Chicoreus